Peruvesi is a medium-sized lake in the Kymijoki main catchment area. It is located in the region Southern Savonia, near the church village of Pertunmaa in the municipality of Pertunmaa, Finland.

See also
List of lakes in Finland

References

Lakes of Pertunmaa